Coast Gymkhana Club Ground is a cricket ground in Mombasa, Kenya.  The first recorded match held on the ground came in 1999 when a Coast Cricket Association XI played the touring Marylebone Cricket Club.  The ground held its first List A match in 2010 when Kenya played the United Arab Emirates.  Kenya won the match by 24 runs. 

The ground is owned by the Coast Gymkhana Club.  The club is located roughly a hundred metres from the Mombasa Sports Club, which has hosted One Day Internationals.

References

External links
Coast Gymkhana Club Ground at ESPNcricinfo
Coast Gymkhana Club Ground at CricketArchive

Cricket grounds in Kenya
Sport in Mombasa
Buildings and structures in Mombasa